Timpuri Noi (New Times in English) is a subway station in Bucharest. The name was taken from the nearby mechanical factory. The factory has since been demolished, making way for a planned office and residential development. The station has yellow, red and white tiling. It was originally the eastern terminus of the M1, being opened on 19 November 1979 as part of the inaugural section of Bucharest Metro, between Semanatoarea and Timpuri Noi. On 28 December 1981, the line was extended east to Republica.

References

Bucharest Metro stations
Railway stations opened in 1979
1979 establishments in Romania